Bellegarde (Provençal: Bèlagarda) is a commune in the Gard départment in southern France.

The village was the birthplace of Batisto Bonnet (1844–1925), a noted writer in the Provençal dialect.

Population

See also
 Costières de Nîmes AOC
Communes of the Gard department

References

Communes of Gard